Black Maria (1923–1932) was an American Thoroughbred racing filly who earned national Champion honors three times.

Background
Bred in Kentucky by William R. Coe, she was sired by Black Toney, the great foundation stallion of Idle Hour Stock Farm. Her dam was Bird Loose, a daughter of the French stallion Sardanapale, a two-time Leading sire in France who won the 1914 Prix du Jockey Club and, at the time France's most important race, the Grand Prix de Paris.

Racing career
Black Maria raced as a two-year-old and won but did not claim victory in any of the top races for her age group. A filly who regularly raced against male horses, after winning the Kentucky Oaks for fillies, she defeated males in the Saratoga Sales Stakes and the Aqueduct Handicap. Her performances at age three earned her American Champion Three-Year-Old Filly honors. Black Maria was voted the 1927 and 1928 American Champion Older Female Horse, highlighted by her defeat of males in the preeminent race on the U.S. East Coast for milers, the Metropolitan Handicap in a performance that made The New York Times call her "a great race mare." At age five, she beat her male counterparts again to win the Whitney Handicap.

In 1932, Black Maria suffered a broken leg as a result of a paddock accident and was humanely destroyed.

Name
She was named after an earlier world-famous black racehorse, the second element of whose name was pronounced /məˈraɪə/ (ma-rye-ah) in accordance with the traditional English pronunciation of Latin and Latin-based names always used at that time. The first Black Maria was foaled in Harlem, New York in 1826. She won so many races her purse winnings alone amounted to nearly $15,000, a very large sum for the period. Her most famous exploit occurred on 13 October 1832 when she won the race for the Jockey Club purse of $600 at the Union Course. In 1870, an article about her in Harper's New Monthly Magazine said: "The track was heavy, and yet, to achieve a victory, twenty miles had to be run. We wonder if there is a horse on the turf to-day that could stand up under such a performance as this?."

Her speed was implied in the nickname given to horse-drawn black (or dark blue) police prisoner vans of the period, swiftly whisking felons away from the scene of a crime. This name for a police van was adopted in Britain and even France where a similar term was already in use.

Pedigree

References

1923 racehorse births
1932 racehorse deaths
Racehorses bred in Kentucky
Racehorses trained in the United States
American Champion racehorses
Kentucky Oaks winners
Thoroughbred family 14-a